Jozef Piaček (born 20 June 1983) is a Slovak former football defender.

From 2006 to 2008 he played in Latvia with Skonto. He played in 27 of the Riga club's 28 matches in the 2006 season, scoring three goals. Piaček was part of the Žilina squad which reached the group stage of the 2010–11 UEFA Champions League. He played in five of the six group matches.

References

External links
 

1983 births
Living people
Slovak footballers
FC ViOn Zlaté Moravce players
Skonto FC players
Expatriate footballers in Latvia
Expatriate footballers in Poland
MŠK Žilina players
Podbeskidzie Bielsko-Biała players
Ekstraklasa players
Slovak expatriate sportspeople in Latvia
Slovak Super Liga players
People from Zlaté Moravce
Sportspeople from the Nitra Region
Association football defenders
Slovak expatriate sportspeople in Poland
Slovak expatriate footballers